Oleksii Zhylenko (Ukrainian: Олексій Жиленко), was born in Kyiv, Ukraine. He is a professional Ballroom and Latin dance coach, a World class adjudicator, a professional ballroom dancer and a DanceSport competitor and choreographer.

Dance competition

As a dance competitor he was finalist of the World Cup in International Ballroom (2006, Moscow, Russia), the National Champion of Ukraine (2002 and 2010), obtained the title of Master of Sport of Ukraine (2002) and was winner and medalist of major national and international championships.

As a Ballroom and Latin dance coach

In his coaching career his students were

 Mykola Khrabust & Olga Riznychenko are Champions of the World (2013), National Champions of Ukraine (2012)  in age group Senior.
 Denys Korostashov & Nataliya Kostyleva are National Champions of Ukraine (2009), Bronze medalists of World Championship (2011) in age group Under 21.

Memberships

 1997 – present. Ukrainian Dance Sport Association (Kyiv, Ukraine)
 2009 – present. World Dance Council (London, Great Britain) – International Adjudicator.
 2012 – present. World Dance Council (London, Great Britain) – International Competitor and International Dance Teacher.
 2013 – present. International Dance Council CID UNESCO (Paris, France).

References

Living people
Ukrainian male dancers
Ukrainian ballroom dancers
Dance teachers
Dancers from Kyiv
Place of birth missing (living people)
Year of birth missing (living people)